Paul Fernand Kra Koff is a paralympic athlete from Côte d'Ivoire competing mainly in category T12 middle-distance events.

Paul Fernand competed in the 2000 Summer Paralympics in Sydney, Australia.  He competed in the T12 1500m and 400m but it was in the 800m where he won a bronze medal

References

External links
 

Year of birth missing (living people)
Living people
Ivorian male sprinters
Ivorian male middle-distance runners
Paralympic athletes of Ivory Coast
Athletes (track and field) at the 2000 Summer Paralympics
Paralympic bronze medalists for Ivory Coast
Medalists at the 2000 Summer Paralympics
Paralympic medalists in athletics (track and field)
Visually impaired middle-distance runners
Paralympic middle-distance runners